Neoregelia longipedicellata is a species of bromeliad in the genus Neoregelia. This species is endemic to Brazil.

References

longipedicellata
Flora of Brazil